Tartu Ülikool Fauna is an Estonian football club based in Tartu. The club was founded in 1998; Fauna currently plays in the III liiga Lõuna division, the fourth tier of Estonian football.

Current squad
''As of 24 August 2013.

League history

References

External links
  

Football clubs in Estonia
Association football clubs established in 1998
Ulikool Fauna
1998 establishments in Estonia
University of Tartu